Duan Zhengchun, also known by his temple name as the Emperor Zhongzong of Dali, was the 15th emperor of the Dali Kingdom. He reigned from 1096 to 1108. He was the younger brother of Duan Zhengming, and the first ruler of the Later Dali Kingdom.

In 1094, Duan Zhengming was forced by Gao Shengtai to abdicate and become a monk. Gao then crowned himself emperor. However, after two years of reign, Gao Shengtai died in 1096 and made a will to return the throne to the Duan family. Duan Zhengchun ascended to the throne in 1096.

Duan Zhengchun abdicated and became a monk in 1108. He was succeeded by his son Duan Yu.

In fiction

Duan Zhengchun is fictionalised as one of the key supporting characters in the wuxia  Demi-Gods and Semi-Devils by Louis Cha.

Notes

11th-century births
12th-century deaths
Dali emperors
Chinese Buddhist monarchs
11th-century Chinese monarchs
12th-century Chinese monarchs
Monarchs who abdicated